The National Register of Champion Trees is a list of the largest tree specimens found in the United States as reported to American Forests by the public. A tree on this list is called a National Champion Tree.

The National Register of Champion Trees has been maintained since 1940 by American Forests. To be eligible, a species must be recognized as native or naturalized in the United States.

American Forests uses the following formula to calculate a point score for each tree so that they may be compared to others:

Trunk Circumference (in inches) + Height (in feet) +  1/4 Average Crown Spread (in feet) = Total Points 

The National Register of Champion Trees is updated yearly and is available to view online. In addition to the national list, states, counties, and cities maintain their own list of local Champion Trees.

See also
The Big Tree, national champion Bur Oak in Missouri
Alabama Champion Tree Program
Arkansas Champion Tree Program
Flora of Door County, Wisconsin § Individual trees
Trees of New York City § Notable trees
List of individual trees

References

External links 
 National Register of Big Trees
 Champion Trees of the United Kingdom
 The New Zealand Notable Trees Trust
Virginia Big Tree Program

Lists of trees
Forestry in the United States
1940 establishments in the United States